Rum (ron in Spanish) production has been an important part of Puerto Rico's economy since the 16th century. While sugar cane harvesting has virtually disappeared in Puerto Rico (except for a few isolated farms and agricultural experiments), distilleries around the island still produce large amounts of rum every year. Don Q is the top-selling rum brand on the island, where more than 70% of the rum consumed in the United States is produced.

Rum production by city

Arecibo
The main rum producing enterprise in Arecibo is Barceló, Marqués Y Co. Its flagship brand was Ron Palo Viejo. Ron Palo Viejo is now owned by Serrallés, whose flagship rum is Don Q.

Rum has been produced in Arecibo since the second half of the 19th century. Roses, García y Co. was bottling their Ron de la Casa de Roses as early as 1868. Ron Llave dates from 1891, and by 1893 they were purveyors of rum under license from the Royal house of Spain.

There were several rum producers in Arecibo by the beginning of the 20th century. Most of them merged their distillery operations into a single entity, the Puerto Rico Distilling Co., which was formally incorporated on February 2, 1911. The new company eventually became the principal supplier of partially refined or final product to rum aging, blending and bottling companies in Mayagüez and Bayamón. During Prohibition the company turned into producing denatured alcohol, bay rum (up to 265 different brands of bay rum were eventually produced at the main distilling plant, including the best-selling Alcoholado Superior 70 and Alcoholado Santa Claus) and other industrial products. Rum production returned in 1934, with Ron Candado. In 1935, a joint venture with Florida Cane Products, Inc., spawned a new corporation, Ron Rico, whose flagship product was the Ronrico rum and which had considerable success selling rum in the United States. A new distilling plant was opened in 1942.

The following are rums produced in Arecibo (or in nearby Barceloneta while the holding company was Arecibo-based):
 Ron Pizá
 Ron Llave
 Ron Candado
 Ron Tres Estrellas
 Ron San Isidro
 Ron Cañón
 Ron Portela
 Ron Granado
 Ron Palo Viejo (Produced in Camuy, near Arecibo)

Bayamón
 Ron del Barrilito - Edmundo B. Fernandez Inc.

The company producing it was founded by Edmundo Fernandez in the early 19th century. It has produced its rum inside a brick and mortar windmill tower located originally within a sugar cane plantation, the Hacienda Santa Ana, now an industrial park in the outskirts of Bayamón. Its yearly production run is a limited one. The company is known for a rum liqueur which is made with honey. The company was sold and recapitalized by a partnership led by a member of the Bacardi family including other local investors. It has diversified its product to include premium aged rums.

Cataño
 Bacardi is produced in Cataño near San Juan. It is owned by the Bacardi family who are originally from Cuba.

Cidra
In 2014 it was announced that CC1 Industries Inc. would be constructing a new rum distillery Club Caribe Distillers in Cidra, Puerto Rico. This was the location of a pharmaceutical plant owned by GlaxoSmithKline which had closed. The new distillery however included a hospitality center and function hall contributing to local tourism. CC1 Industries Inc. is affiliated with Florida Caribbean Distillers which is based in Florida. The distillery was completed and ran its first distillation run in September 2018.

Jayuya
 PitoRico - Destilería Cruz Ron Artesanal Puertorriqueño

The word pitorro is something deeply engrained into the collective consciousness of Puerto Ricans. For decades, the production of this rum has been deemed clandestine by the authorities, simply because it did not pay taxes. Destilería Cruz is a company founded by José Luis Cruz and produces PitoRico in Jayuya, Puerto Rico. Mr. Cruz, a native of Jayuya, remembers fondly how his uncle and other family members would skillfully brew the pitorro, especially during the Christmas season. The drink is made in various fruit flavor, including passion fruit, coconut, anise, and tamarind.

Juncos
 Ron Caray

Mayagüez
The city of Mayagüez had various rum producing companies, some of which were contractors for United States- and Bahamian-based public and private brands. The most successful was José González Clemente y Co. (JGC); other companies were: Ron Oro Nativo (RON, whose parent company was Seagram), Alfredo Vega Toro y Co. (AVT), Baltasar Cruz y Co. (BC), Luis García y Co. (LG), Julio Maldonado y Co. (JM), the Mayagüez Rum Company (MRC), and "Primitivo Grau y Co (PG). Among the brands produced in Mayagüez were (bottler in parentheses):
 Christopher Columbus Rum (RON, credited as being bottled by the Christopher Columbus Rum Co.)
 Government House Rum (MRC) This was originally produced in the United States Virgin Islands.
 Myers's Rum - Jamaican bulk heavy dark rum bottled once in Mayagüez by JGC, later bottled by Destilería Serrallés, Inc. in Ponce
 Reserva Especial (RON)
 Ron 738 (LG)
 Ron Delicias (JM)
 Ron El Campesino (JM)
 Ron El Invencible (BC)
 Ron Imporico (JCG) - an imitator of Ronrico
 Ron Latino (AVT)
 Ron Mister Kuba (JM)
 Ron Oro Nativo (RON)
 Ron Patria y Cuna (JGC)
 Ron Rey de Copas (BC)
 Ron Superior Escudo (BC) - an imitator of Ron Superior; use of the name was discontinued due to an injunction by JGC
 Ron Superior Puerto Rico (JGC) - the best known brand, which lasted from 1909 until the company's closing in 1980.
 Ron Caneca (PG) - Known to this day for the flask-shaped bottle. Now produced organically by descendants of Primitivo Grau.
 Ron Toro Negro (LG)
 Ron Yagüez (LG)

Samples of all these brands or their labels are kept as part of the historical collection of the Castillo Serrallés in Ponce.
 Ron Pitorro - Destilería Coquí.

The Puerto Rico Sugar Company established a new rum distillery in Mayagüez in 2009, named Destilería Coquí; its production is limited to 100 bottles a day.  The Destilería's main product is an artisan rum called Pitorro, analogous to the name in common use to describe Puerto Rican moonshine rum.

Ponce
 Don Q  (Serrallés) - Puerto Rico's top-selling rum
 Blackbeard Spiced Rum (Serrallés)
 Boca Chica Rum - Boca Chica Distilling Company
 Caliche Rum (Serrallés)

The main rum-producing enterprise in Ponce is Destilería Serrallés, Inc., which has been producing rum in site since 1865. Its flagship brand, Ron Don Q (short for Don Quijote, the favorite character of one of the Serrallés family heirs) dates from 1932. Don Q is Puerto Rico's top-selling rum.

San Juan
 Scryer Rum - small-batch pot-distilled, premium rum aged in Old San Juan, PR

Illegal rum production

Pitorro (also known as "ron caña") 
In addition to the brands mentioned above, illegal makers of "moonshine" rum, nicknamed cañita (not to be confused with the current "legal" brand, which merely adopted the popular term, and which had a precursor in the late 1930s) or pitorro rum, tend to operate in Puerto Rico, particularly around the Christmas season. The word "pitorro" is actually a corruption of the word "pintorro", an Andalusian term used to depict inferior-quality wine or rum that had a weak color (hence the name). Clandestine rum operations are rather uncommon nowadays in Puerto Rico, given the fact that sugar cane production has dwindled in Puerto Rico since the closing of government-owned "centrales" or mills. Nevertheless, authorities confiscate many cañita/pitorro rum productions every year. A town renowned for its "pitorro" production is Añasco, given its proximity to Mayagüez (rum production talent and recipes) and its former (and current, in some areas) harvesting of sugar cane.

Pitorro is also a term given to homemade flavored rum, prepared by adding various fruits spices and/or flavorings to ferment over a period of time. A particularly favored variety made with quenepas called Bilí is made in Vieques.

Miscellaneous rum production notes
 Club Caribe - (Company: Club Caribe LLC, Cidra, Puerto Rico) created to offset the losses from Captain Morgan moving to the Virgin Islands
 Don Q - the topselling rum brand in Puerto Rico
 Bacardi is produced in Cataño - it is originally from Cuba.
 Ron Castillo - produced by Ron de Castillo y Cia (San Juan, Puerto Rico), a subsidiary of Bacardi.
 Trigo Reserva Añeja - produced by Trigo Corp, San Juan, Puerto Rico, who purchases its rum base from Bacardi. The Trigo Corp specializes in aging and blending local rums according to their own unique methods. In addition to Reserva Aneja, they produce the popular Ron Canita de Alambique, Trigo Coquito, Twin Isle and Ron Bugalu coconut rum.

Other
 Marin
 Ron Pascual
 Three Captains

References

External links

Rum
Rums
Puerto Rican rums